Sea Captains Carousing in Surinam is an oil painting by John Greenwood made between 1752-1758.  It depicts a humorous scene in a tavern in Surinam, with many merchants and sea captains from Rhode Island enjoying themselves.  It has been described as the first genre painting in American art history. The work was commissioned by the subjects while visiting the important trading ports in Surinam in the 1750s, probably for their own amusement.  At the time, Greenwood was living in Surinam.  

The subjects in the painting include Nicholas Cooke, sitting at the table smoking a pipe, speaking to Esek Hopkins; Joseph Wanton who has passed out in a chair, and Stephen Hopkins is pouring a drink (perhaps rum punch) from a porcelain bowl onto Wanton's head; and another unidentified figure is vomiting into his pocket.  Cooke and Wanton were both later Governors of Rhode Island, Esek Hopkins was a commander in the Continental Navy from 1775 to 1778, and Founding Father Stephen Hopkins signed the US Declaration of Independence in 1776. Greenwood has also included a self-portrait, holding a candle by the doorway. "The man with his back to the table is Daniel Jenckes."  Two sailors are dancing, possibly "Nicholas Power [giving] a dancing lesson to young Godfrey Malbone,"  while others are sleeping, smoking pipes, or playing cards.  Among the white merchants are several dark-skinned servants, possibly slaves, wearing few clothes and carrying drinks in large bowls.

The painting was owned by the Jenckes family in Providence, Rhode Island from the 1750s until the 20th century.  It was bought in 1948 by the Saint Louis Art Museum, in St. Louis, Missouri. It is painted in oils on bed ticking and measures .

References

External links
 Sea Captains Carousing in Surinam, c.1752-1758
 Sea Captains Carousing in Surinam, Saint Louis Art Museum
 Colonial American Merchants Satirized in Art, National Humanities Center, 2009 
 The New-York Historical Society to Open Its Renovated Home with the Pathbreaking Inaugural Exhibition Revolution!, New-York Historical Society, 23 June 2011

1750s paintings
American paintings
Paintings in the collection of the Saint Louis Art Museum
Dance in art
Food and drink paintings